The Ṣadr Dīwānī ʿAdālat (English: Sudder Dewanny Adawlut) was the Supreme Court of Revenue in British India established at Calcutta by Warren Hastings in 1772. It was reformed in 1780 and again in 1793 by the British Parliament. The court's judges were the Governor General and Council Members of the East India Company, assisted by native judges and officers of revenue.

Meaning
The term is in the Urdu:
Sudder signifies literally "the breast"; the fore-court of a house; the chief seat of government, contradistinguished from Mofussil, or interior of the country; the presidency.
Dewan is an ancient Persian word which was adopted throughout the Islamic world, meaning a powerful government official, minister or ruler.
Adawlut, signifying "justice", "equity", a court of justice. The term Dewanny Adawlut signifies a civil court of justice. Foujdarry Adawlut signifies a criminal court of justice.

History
The court was established to allow Hindu Indians to be governed by Hindu law in matters of property, and not as before by Muslim law, although they were still subject to Muslim criminal law.

In each of the districts of British India, subordinate courts of revenue with definitive jurisdiction of up to 500 rupees, were established in which the judges were the relevant District Collector and his deputy and registrar, assisted by native officers. For cases exceeding 500 rupees, appeals were allowed to the Sudder Dewanny Adawlut.

The court was abolished after the Indian Rebellion of 1857.

See also
 Sadr Faujdari Adalat
 Judiciary of India

References

External links
 English Law in India by Anil Chandra Banerjee
 2.13 MAHARASHTRA
 Glossary: S, A glossary of special terminology used in India during the British Administration
 History of Medieval India by Chand, Hukam]
 Administrative System in India by U.B. Singh

Legal history of India
Hindi words and phrases
Urdu-language words and phrases